Jaakko Luoma (9 July 1897 – 12 March 1940) was a Finnish middle-distance runner. He competed in the men's 1500 metres at the 1924 Summer Olympics. He was killed in action during World War II.

References

External links
 

1897 births
1940 deaths
Athletes (track and field) at the 1924 Summer Olympics
Finnish male middle-distance runners
Olympic athletes of Finland
Place of birth missing
Finnish military personnel killed in World War II